The Kremenchuk flight college of Kharkiv National University of Internal Affairs (KFC KNUIA) is a college in Ukraine specialising in the teaching of aerospace-related courses.

History

Soviet era
The foundations of flight training in Kremenchuk lay in the postwar period. In 1952, the Tenth Military Aviation School for ab initio training of pilots of the Air Force was established by a decision of the Kiev military district command. Some time later, in 1956, the school was reorganized as a specialized flight school, because of the great need for civil aviation pilots during the changeover of the country to a peacetime footing. On 1 July 1960 it was decided to create Kremenchug Aviation flight school by the command of the Air Force Chief at the Council of USSR Ministers Colonel General E.T. Loginov. Kremenchuk was chosen as an aviation personnel training center because during the first postwar Five-Year Plan it had become an important industrial city with a developed road, rail and river traffic infrastructure. The geographical location of the city on the Dnieper River was also considered an important factor in this choice. The Kremenchug region is mainly flat, cut through with the woods and rivers, which made it ideal for flying training. Weather conditions were also favorable: a lot of sunny days, with mild winters. Prevailing south-eastern winds made flights possible throughout the year and in all weather conditions.

Post-Ukraine independence
After the breakup of the Soviet Union the school was renamed Kremenchug Flight College in 1993. Since 2003 the college has been part of the National Aviation University along with Sloviansk college, Kryvyi Rih college, Zhytomyr military institute and other campuses.

In its more than 50-year history KFC NAU has trained more than 60,000 professionals from Ukraine and CIS countries; and approximately 7,000 aviation specialists from 73 other countries (including Australia, Bulgaria, Spain, Iran, India, Canada, China, Congo, Cuba, Laos, Libya, Mexico, Germany, Nepal, Poland, USA and Ecuador). Training and retraining of foreign specialists was and remains one of the biggest priorities of Kremenchug Flight College NAU.

KFC NAU has specialised in the field of training and retraining of helicopter personnel. Fixed-wing aircraft used include the Yakovlev Yak-18T and Antonov An-2; training helicopters used over the years include the Aerocopter AK-1-3, Kamov Ka-15, Kamov Ka-26, Mil Mi-1, Mil Mi-2, Mil Mi-4, Mil Mi-8 and Mil Mi-26.

Campuses and buildings
The infrastructure of the school includes two buildings. Studies and laboratories are used for academic training. In addition to several laboratories for teaching science and technical subjects, there are procedures trainers for the Mi-2, Mi-8 and Mi-8MTV. Vocational subjects are taught in single-purpose studies, equipped with proper training aids.
A library reading hall can accommodate up to 80 people.

The Campus also includes cadets’ dormitories of  that can accommodate up to 500 students; a 300-seat canteen (one of several dining facilities accommodating a total of 626 persons); a sports complex; and a training airfield with ancillary facilities.

Departments and faculties
The academic training department of the college consists of 7 departments:
 Aeronautical and technical subjects
 Economy
 Distance training
 Foreign students and conversion training
 Training process managing and monitoring
 Practical training and employment
 Methodical assistance
 Library

12 faculties provide training:
 Airframe flight line maintenance faculty
 Airframe and engines design faculty
 Avionics faculty
 Technical subjects faculty
 Fuel and oils faculty
 Accountancy and audit faculty
 Transport companies management faculty
 General economics faculty
 Nature science, mathematics and information technologies faculty
 Social and humanitarian faculty
 Ukrainian and English language faculty
 Physical training faculty

Notable alumni
Among the tens of thousands pilot graduates are several recipients of the title Hero of the Soviet Union, including:

 Alexei Leonov, cosmonaut; the first person to conduct an extra-vehicular activity (EVA), also known as a space walk
 Anatoli Levchenko, cosmonaut; selected to be the back-up commander of the first Buran space shuttle flight
 Akhmatger Gardapkhadze, a Tupolev Tu-134 captain who foiled the attempted hijacking of Aeroflot Flight 6833
 Luis R. Taveras, a Project Mgt & Planning Operations Rep. Lead under United States Department of Defense, a highly visible and demanding Mil Mi-17 helicopter military management program located in Afghanistan.

Awards and reputation
On 4 January 1983, the College was awarded the Order of Friendship of Peoples by the Presidium of the Supreme Soviet of the USSR, for its "great contribution in training highly skilled aviation personnel for civil aviation of the USSR and other countries and mastering new aircraft types".

References
Official site

Universities in Ukraine
1960 establishments in Ukraine